Peter Butler (born February 15, 1958) is a former Canadian long-distance runner who was a national champion in the outdoor 5,000 metres and 10,000 metres. Butler competed in the men's 10,000 metres at the 1983 World Championships in Helsinki, Finland. At the 1985 California International Marathon, Butler set a course record with a time of 2:10:56. This time remains the fifth fastest marathon run by a Canadian.

Achievements

References

External links
 
 
 
 

1958 births
Living people
Canadian male long-distance runners
World Athletics Championships athletes for Canada
Athletes (track and field) at the 1978 Commonwealth Games
Athletes (track and field) at the 1982 Commonwealth Games
Athletes (track and field) at the 1986 Commonwealth Games
Commonwealth Games competitors for Canada